The Hans Fallada Prize is a German literary prize given by the city of Neumünster in the German state of Schleswig-Holstein. Since 1981 it typically awarded every two years to a young author from the German-speaking world.  It is named in honor of Hans Fallada, a famous 20th-century German author known for addressing political and social problems of his day in fiction.

The prize was first awarded in 1981, the fiftieth anniversary of the publication of Fallada's A Small Circus (Bauern, Bonzen und Bomben).

The prize comes with an honorarium of 10,000 euros.  In the case that two authors win the award, the prize money is halved.

Award winners 

 1981: Erich Loest
 1983: 
 1985: Sten Nadolny
 1988: Ralph Giordano
 1990: Jurek Becker
 1993: Helga Schubert
 1996: Günter Grass
 1998: Bernhard Schlink
 2000: Thomas Brussig
 2002: Birgit Vanderbeke
 2004: Wilhelm Genazino
 2006: Iris Hanika
 2008: Ralf Rothmann
 2010: Lukas Bärfuss
 2012: Wolfgang Herrndorf
 2014: Jenny Erpenbeck
 2016: Jonas Lüscher
 2018: 
 2020: Saša Stanišić
 2022:

References

External links
Hans-Fallada-Preis der Stadt Neumünster 

Awards established in 1981
German literary awards
Fiction awards
Literary awards honouring young writers
Neumünster